Orcasur is an administrative neighborhood (barrio) of Madrid belonging to the district of Usera. As of 1 March 2020, it has a population of 14,264. The Hospital Universitario 12 de Octubre is located in the neighborhood.

References 

Wards of Madrid
Usera